Grumento Nova is a town and comune in the province of Potenza, in the Southern Italian region of Basilicata. The ancient name of the town was Saponara.

In the locality Spineta are the remains of the Roman town of Grumentum.

References

Cities and towns in Basilicata